This  list of Wake Forest University people includes notable alumni, faculty and staff of Wake Forest University, a 
private research university located in the American city of Winston-Salem, North Carolina.

Wake Forest University presidents

Notable faculty

Current and former Faculty 
 

Maya Angelou, American studies
John A. Allison IV, School of Business
Anthony Atala, Urology (Chair) 
Alfred Brauer, Mathematics
Deborah L. Best, Psychology
Pasco Bowman II, Law  
Rhoda Billings, Law (Emerita) 
Margaret Bender, Anthropology
John Wesley Chandler, Philosophy
Dave Clawson, coach of Wake Forest Football (2014–present)
Coy Cornelius Carpenter, M.D., dean of the School of Medicine of Wake Forest University from 1936 to 1967 and vice president for health affairs 1963–67
David Carroll, Physics, Director of the Center for Nanotechnology and Molecular Materials 
Justin Catanoso, Journalism 
Jim Caldwell, coach of Wake Forest Football (1993–2000), current NFL head coach
Zheng Cui, Pathology 
David Faber, Art and printmaking 
Steve Forbes, coach of Wake Forest basketball (2020–present)
Jim Grobe, Coach of Wake Forest football (2001–2013), won ACC Coach of the Year 
Jennifer Hoover, coach of Wake Forest Women's basketball
Melissa Harris-Perry, Presidential Chair Professor of Politics and International Affairs
Dan Locklair, Music and Composer-in-Residence
Allen Mandelbaum, English and Humanities 
Danny Manning, Wake Forest basketball coach (2014–2020) 
Jack McCloskey, coach of Wake Forest basketball (1966–1972)
Dave Odom, coach of Wake Forest basketball (1989–2001), three-time ACC Coach of the Year
Suzanne Reynolds (J.D. 1977),  Law  
Earl Smith, professor 
Chris Webber, former NBA all-star, professor in practice for Masters of Arts in Sports program  
Jonathan L. Walton, dean of Wake Forest School of Divinity
Sarah Watts, History 
Tom Walter, current coach of Wake Forest baseball (2010–present) 
Tanya Zanish-Belcher, professor, Director of Special Collections and Archives

Notable alumni

Academia

Founders and leaders of academic institutions
James Archibald Campbell (B.A. 1911): 1st president of Campbell College
Leslie H. Campbell (1911): 2nd president of Campbell College
John Wesley Chandler (B.A. 1945): 12th president of Williams College, 15th president of Hamilton College and president of the AACU in 1985  
Spright Dowell (1896): former president of Auburn University and Mercer University
William Louis Poteat (B.A. 1877): educator; 7th President of Wake Forest University (1905–1927) 
Michael Maxey (B.A., M.A.): 11th president of Roanoke College
George M. Modlin (B.A. 1924): former president of the University of Richmond 
Washington Manly Wingate (1849): 4th president of Wake Forest University
Norman Adrian Wiggins (1952): 3rd president of Campbell University

Arts and letters

Literature and poetry
Stephen Amidon, author 
Joseph Quincy Adams Jr. (B.A. 1900, M.A. 1901)
A.R. Ammons (1949), poet and scholar 
Dhonielle Clayton (B.A. 2005), author & CEO of We Need Diverse Books
Gary Chapman (M.A.), author and radio talk show host
Justin Catanoso (M.A. 1993), Author
Frances O'Roark Dowell (1979), author 
L.M. Elliott (B.A.), author, Under a War-Torn Sky

Journalism & Media

Linda Carter Brinson, writer, editor, and journalist
W.J. Cash, author and journalist
Becky Garrison (B.A.), religious satirist and columnist for The Wittenburg Door
Emily Giffin (B.A.), author of Something Borrowed
James Hamblin (B.S. 2005), board-certified physician, staff writer at The Atlantic, lecturer in public health policy at Yale University
Maria Henson (B.A. 1982), journalist, editor, winner of the Pulitzer Prize for Editorial Writing award.
Melissa Harris-Perry (B.A. 1994), political scientist and journalist
Al Hunt (B.A. 1965), journalist and Columnist for Bloomberg News 
Harold Hayes, writer, former editor of Esquire magazine
Kasha Patel (B.A. 2012), Science writer 
Dagen McDowell (1991), anchor for Fox Business Channel and business correspondent for Fox News
Carlos Maza (B.A. 2010), journalist for Vox
LaChina Robinson (B.A. 2002), women's college basketball analyst for Fox Sports 1. 
Scott Rasmussen (M.B.A.), political analyst 

Music
Lamar Stringfield, classical composer, flutist, symphony conductor and anthologist of American folk music.
Christopher Magiera, international operatic baritone, professor of voice

Film and television

Carol Barbee (B.A.), television producer, writer
Stephanie Birkitt (B.A. 1997), assistant to David Letterman on Late Show with David LettermanMarc Blucas (1994), actor
David Chase (attended), television writer, director, producer (The Sopranos)
James DuBose, film and television producer, entertainment industry executive; Rising Star Award recipient 
Matt James (B.A. 2015), television personality, first black bachelor lead for The BachelorJoe Lawson, co-creator of GEICO Cavemen commercials and ABC's Cavemen TV seriesCarter MacIntyre, television actor (American Heiress, Undercovers)
Lee Norris (B.A. 2004), film and television actor (Boy Meets World, The Torkelsons, One Tree Hill)
Carroll O'Connor, actor (best known as Archie Bunker on the TV series All in the Family)
Sarah Schneider (2005), former writer for Saturday Night Live
Dave Willis, co-creator of the animated TV shows Aqua Teen Hunger Force and Squidbillies; writer and voice actor for animated TV show Space Ghost: Coast to CoastArvind Swamy, Indian Tamil film actor and businessman

Visual art
Justin Brice Guariglia (B.A. 1997), artist and former documentary photographer for the National Geographic Society
Zach Klein, co-founder and designer of Vimeo

Other
Tyler Cameron (B.A. 2018), television personality, model
Cheslie Kryst (J.D., M.B.A. 2017), Miss USA 2019.
Eddie Timanus (1990), USA Today sportswriter; Jeopardy! champion
Ricky Van Veen (2003), co-creator of the website CollegeHumor; entrepreneur

Politics, law, and government

 
 

 

U.S. Governors
J. Melville Broughton (1910), Governor of North Carolina (D) (1941–45) and U.S. Senator
Charlie Crist, Governor of Florida (R) (2006–2010)
Robert L. Ehrlich (J.D. 1982), Governor of Maryland (R) and former Congressman
William W. Kitchin (1884), Governor of North Carolina (D) (1909–13)

U.S. Senators and Congressmen

Josiah W. Bailey (1893), U.S. Senator (D-NC) (1931–46); co-author of the Conservative Manifesto criticizing the New Deal
Richard Burr (B.A. 1978), U.S. Senator (R-NC)
Ted Budd (M.B.A. 2007), U.S. Congressman (NC-13) 
Donna Edwards (B.A. 1980), Democratic Representative of Maryland's 4th Congressional District
David Funderburk (B.A., M.A. 1967), former Congressman (R-NC) (1995–97); U.S. Ambassador to Romania (1981–85)
Kay Hagan (J.D. 1978), Former U.S. Senator of North Carolina  (D-NC)
Jesse Helms, former U.S. Senator (R-NC) (1973–2003)
Larry Kissell (B.A.), U.S. Congressman (D-NC)
Alton A. Lennon (1929), former U.S. Senator; Congressman (D-NC)
Robert Burren Morgan, former U.S. Senator (D-NC) (1977–81)
Furnifold M. Simmons, former U.S. Senator (D-NC) (1901–31)
Charles H. Taylor, former Congressman (R-NC)

Diplomats
James P. Cain (B.A.), former U.S. Ambassador to Denmark 
Dennis Walter Hearne (B.A.), United States Ambassador to Mozambique
Jeanette W. Hyde, former Ambassador to Barbados, Dominica, St. Lucia, Antigua, Grenada, St. Vincent, and St. Christopher-Nevis-Anguilla
Graham Martin, former U.S. ambassador to Italy, Thailand, and South Vietnam
Robert S. Gilchrist (B.A.), United States Ambassador to Lithuania

Federal officials
Robert L. Wilkie (B.A. 1985), former Assistant Secretary of Defense; Current Secretary of Veterans Affairs.

Judges and attorneys
 
Kenneth D. Bell (B.A., J.D.), judge of the United States District Court for the Western District of North Carolina
Rhoda Billings, professor; former Chief Justice of the North Carolina Supreme Court
John E. Dowdell (B.A. 1978), Chief Judge of the United States District Court for the Northern District of Oklahoma
Rusty Duke (B.A. 1970, J.D. 1974), Judge
Britt Grant (B.A.), U.S. Circuit Court Judge, United States Court of Appeals for the 11th Circuit; former Justice of Supreme Court of Georgia
Louise W. Flanagan (B.A. 1984), District Judge for the United States District Court for the Eastern District of North Carolina
Major B. Harding, attorney and former Chief Justice of the Florida Supreme Court
Jerome Holmes (B.A. 1983), Judge on the United States Court of Appeals for the Tenth Circuit
I. Beverly Lake (B.S., J.D.), former Chief Justice of the North Carolina Supreme Court
John C. Martin, Chief Judge of the North Carolina Court of Appeals
Allison Jones Rushing (summa cum laude, B.A. 2004), United States circuit judge of the United States Court of Appeals for the Fourth Circuit
Eleni M. Roumel (B.A.), Judge, United States Court of Federal Claims
Davis R. Ruark (B.A.), former State's Attorney for Wicomico County, Maryland
Emory M. Sneeden (B.S. 1949, L.L.B. 1953), former Judge on the United States Court of Appeals for the Fourth Circuit
George L. Wainwright, Jr., former Associate Justice of the North Carolina Supreme Court

Mayors
James Pratt Carter, former mayor of Madison, North Carolina
Tom Fetzer, former mayor of Raleigh, North Carolina.
Patrick Smathers, former mayor of Canton, North Carolina.

Other
 
Lynton Y. Ballentine (B.A. 1921), 20th lieutenant governor of North Carolina 
Deb Butler (J.D. 1986), member of North Carolina House of Representatives
Ted Budd (M.B.A.), member of the United States House of Representatives for North Carolina's 13th congressional district
John S. Battle (B.A.), served as 56th Governor of Virginia
C. Dan Barrett, Republican candidate for Governor of NC in 2004
Philip E. Berger (J.D. 1982), Republican leader in the North Carolina State Senate
Creigh Deeds (J.D. 1984), 2009 Democratic Party nominee for Governor of Virginia
N. Leo Daughtry (B.A. 1962, L.L.B. 1965), former member of the North Carolina General Assembly
Brigadier General Pat Foote (retired – US Army), first female to be given Brigade Command; first female instructor at the Army War College
Mary P. Easley (B.A. 1972, J.D. 1975), First Lady of North Carolina
James Forrester, North Carolina State Senator
George Holding (B.A., J.D.), current United States Representative for North Carolina's 2nd congressional district
Richard H. Moore, North Carolina Treasurer 
Josh Pitcock (J.D.), former Chief of Staff to vice president Mike Pence under the Trump Administration
Eric Miller Reeves, North Carolina State Senator
Alex Sink (B.A.), former 2nd Chief Financial Officer of Florida (2007–2011); Democratic candidate for Governor of Florida in 2010. 
Greg Habeeb, former Virginia State Delegate representing Virginia's 8th House of Delegates District. (2011-2018)

Science
 Phillip Griffiths (B.S. 1959), mathematician; professor at the Institute for Advanced Study
 Mona Jhaveri, cancer researcher and entrepreneur focused on biotech funding
 Douglas D. Taylor, entrepreneur and former academic researcher in the field of extracellular vesicles
 William Bachovchin (B.S. 1970), chemist/chemical biologist, professor of Molecular and Chemical Biology at Tufts University School of Medicine

Religion
John Wesley Chandler (B.A. 1945), Cluett Professor of Religion and department chair at Williams College
Michael Curry (Attended), 27th presiding bishop and primate of the Episcopal Church, addressed the Wedding of Prince Harry and Meghan Markle.
Amzi Clarence Dixon, Baptist minister and author, older brother of Thomas Dixon, Jr.
Thomas Dixon, Jr. (M.A. 1883), minister and novelist
Samuel Johnson Howard (J.D. 1976), 8th Bishop of the Episcopal Diocese of Florida 
Kimberly Lucas, bishop of The Episcopal Church in Colorado
Ted G. Stone, Southern Baptist evangelist and recovered amphetamine addict
Tish Harrison Warren, New York Times columnist and Anglican priest

Business

Jabez A. Bostwick, founding partner of Standard Oil
Ross Atkins, Executive, General manager of the Toronto Blue Jays
Gregory Brooks, entrepreneur and professional poker player 
D. Wayne Calloway, former CEO of PepsiCo
Michael DeBatt, Gambino crime family mob associate
Charlie Ergen (M.B.A. 1976), co-founder and CEO of Dish Network and EchoStar.
David Farr (BS.1977), CEO of Emerson Electric Company
Anil Rai Gupta (M.B.A.), Chairman and managing director of Havells
Robin Ganzert (B.S., M.B.A.), CEO of the American Humane organization
Zach Klein, co-founder of Vimeo
Justin W. Lee, founder of the Gay Christian Network
Joseph W. Luter III (B.A. 1962), chairman of Smithfield Foods, Inc.
Warren Stephens (M.B.A 1981), Chairman, President and CEO, Stephens Inc. 
David E. Orton (B.S.), engineering executive
G. Kennedy Thompson (M.B.A), Chairman, President and CEO, Wachovia Corp.
Eric C. Wiseman (B.A., M.B.A.), Chairman and Chief Executive Officer, VF Corporation

Dustin Niparko (B.A. 2011, M.S. 2012), Marketing Leader 

Medicine

 William Allan, genetics
 Anthony Atala, regenerative medicine and urology
 Ken Blum, neuropsychopharmacology and genetics
 Paul Bucy, neurology and neurosurgery
 Coy Cornelius Carpenter, dean 
 Erin Calipari (Ph.D. 2013), Pharmacology
 Richard Cytowic, neurology
 James Forrester, politician
 Max Gomez (Ph.D), medical reporter
Tinsley Randolph Harrison, internal medicine
 David L. Heymann, infectious disease
 Robert Lanza, regenerative medicine 
 Diane Mathis (B.S.), immunohaematology
 Thomas T. Mackie, preventive medicine and infectious disease
 Willis Maddrey, internal medicine and hepatology
 Thomas Marshburn, astronaut
 J. Wayne Meredith, Richard T. Myers Professor and Chair of the Department of Surgery, Chief of Clinical Chairs and Chief of Surgery at Wake Forest Baptist Health
 Jerry Punch, ESPN commentator
 Leon S. Robertson, epidemiology 
 Cameron Webb (M.D. 2013), physician, former nominee for Virginia's 5th congressional district, current White House Senior Policy Advisor for Covid-19 in the Biden Administration
 Wendy Young (B.A. 1988, M.S. 1989), chemist

Sports
Athletic administrators
 John Currie, Wake Forest athletics director (2019—present)

American football

Jon Abbate, linebacker in NFL, CFL and UFL, central figure in The 5th Quarter'', film on Wake's 2006 season
Ernie Accorsi (B.A. 1963), NFL executive
Billy Ard, New York Giants
Stanley Arnoux, NFL Linebacker, Super Bowl Champion
Reggie Austin, NFL Cornerback 
Essang Bassey, NFL cornerback
Gary Baldinger, NFL Defensive Tackle. 
K.J. Brent, NFL wide receiver
Rich Baldinger, NFL offensive Lineman
Elmer Barbour, NFL Linebacker
Chris Barclay, NFL running back.
Billy Ray Barnes, NFL half back, 3x Pro-Bowler.
DJ Boldin, NFL wide receiver, current Offensive assistant for the San Francisco 49ers.
Carlos Bradley, NFL Linebacker.
David Braxton, NFL Linebacker.
Tommy Bohanon, NFL fullback for the Jacksonville Jaguars
Ronnie Burgess, NFL defensive back
Jessie Bates, NFL safety for the Cincinnati Bengals.
Josh Bush, NFL Free Safety, Super Bowl 50, Champion, currently a free agent. 
Ben Coleman, NFL offensive lineman
Michael Campanaro, NFL wide receiver for the Baltimore Ravens.
Jim Clack, NFL guard
Desmond Clark, NFL tight end
George Coghill, retired NFL defensive back for the Denver Broncos
Aaron Curry (B.A. 2009), NFL linebacker, No.4 pick in the 2009 NFL Draft.
Tyson Clabo, Former NFL player, Pro-Bowler. 
Greg Dortch, NFL wide receiver
Harry Dowda, NFL running back
Kenny Duckett, NFL wide receiver
Duke Ejiofor, NFL Linebacker, Houston Texans.
Bob Grant, NFL linebacker
Clark Gaines, NFL running back
Bill George, NFL linebacker 
Brandon Ghee, NFL cornerback 
Cam Glenn (2018), CFL defensive back
Chris Givens, NFL wide receiver for the Baltimore Ravens 
Justin Herron, NFL offensive lineman
Kendall Hinton (Class of 2019), NFL wide receiver
Kevin Johnson, defensive back for the Houston Texans
Syd Kitson, NFL guard
Joe Looney, NFL player for the Dallas Cowboys 
Dave LaCrosse, NFL linebacker
Ovie Mughelli, fullback for the Atlanta Falcons 
Jamie Newman (Class of 2019), NFL Quarterback
Harry Newsome, former NFL Player
Calvin Pace, NFL defensive end
James "Quick" Parker, retired professional football player, Canadian Football Hall of Fame
Brian Piccolo, retired professional football player, former fullback for the Chicago Bears
Ryan Plackemeier, punter for the Seattle Seahawks
Ricky Proehl, NFL wide receiver, Carolina Panthers wide receivers coach 
Tanner Price, professional football player
Jerry Punch, auto racing and college football commentator on ESPN
Fred Robbins, NFL defensive tackle for the New York Giants 
Anthony Rubino, NFL tackle for the Detroit Lions 
Norm Snead, NFL quarterback; four-time Pro Bowler
Jyles Tucker, NFL linebacker
Kyle Wilber, NFL linebacker, currently plays for the Las Vegas Raiders.
Nikita Whitlock, NFL player, current free agent.
John Henry Mills, NFL running back, linebacker and tight end; Pro-Bowl
Walter Rasby, NFL tight end
Michael McCrary, NFL defensive end, 2-time Pro-Bowler, Super Bowl XXXV Champion 
Marquel Lee,  Middle Linebacker for the Oakland Raiders. 
Alphonso Smith, former NFL player.
Chip Vaughn, former NFL player, Super Bowl XLIV, Champion with the New Orleans Saints, currently plays for the Saskatchewan Roughriders of the Canadian Football League. 
John Wolford (2017), professional football player

Major League Baseball
Gair Allie, MLB player
Mike Buddie, former Major League Baseball pitcher for the Yankees and Brewers
Ryan Braun, MLB pitcher
Dave Bush, former MLB pitcher, currently plays for the SK Wyverns of the Korea Baseball Organization 
Tommy Byrne, MLB player, 1949 and 1956 World Series Champion with the New York Yankees.
Rip Coleman, MLB Player, 1956 World series Champion with the New York Yankees.
Will Craig, first round pick in the 2016 MLB Draft, currently with the Pittsburgh Pirates. 
Allan Dykstra, MLB player
Bill Dillman, MLB Player 
Parker Dunshee, MLB player for the Oakland Athletics
Stuart Fairchild, current MLB Player for the Cincinnati Reds organization
Lee Gooch, MLB Player
Tommy Gregg, MLB player 
Erik Hanson, MLB Player
Bill Herring, minor league baseball pitcher, player-manager, and general manager 
Kevin Jarvis, former MLB pitcher, currently a scout for the San Diego Padres
Buddy Lewis, MLB Player, 2x MLB All-Star
Mike MacDougal, former MLB relief pitcher, MLB All-Star.
Willard Marshall, former MLB player, three-time MLB All-Star
Jack Meyer, MLB player, Philadelphia Phillies
Craig Robinson, former MLB player 
Griffin Roberts, MLB player for the St. Louis Cardinals 
Brick Smith, former MLB player 
Cory Sullivan, MLB player
Kyle Sleeth, No.3 overall pick in MLB draft, former MLB player
Ray Scarborough, retired MLB player, 10 MLB seasons, MLB All-Star, 1952 World Series Champion with the New York Yankees.
Gavin Sheets, 49th pick in the 2017 MLB Draft, current MLB player for the Chicago White Sox organization. 
 Jared Shuster (born 1998), baseball pitcher, first round 2020 MLB draft pick of the Atlanta Braves 
Mac Williamson, MLB player

Basketball

 

 

 

Al-Farouq Aminu, small forward for the Portland Trail Blazers NBA team
Muggsy Bogues (Class of 1987), retired NBA player, 14 years in the NBA,  played for the Charlotte Hornets, Washington Bullets, Golden State Warriors, and Toronto Raptors,  shortest NBA player of all time, standing 5 ft 3 in (1.60 m)(Jersey retired) 
Chaundee Brown (transferred to Michigan), professional basketball player
Dave Budd, center for the New York Knicks  
Chaundee Brown (Transferred to Michigan), professional basketball player
Skip Brown, former college basketball player and athletic director for Wake Forest, selected by the Boston Celtics in the 1977 NBA Draft. 
Bryant Crawford, professional basketball player for Hapoel Gilboa Galil.
John Collins, 19th overall pick in the 2017 NBA Draft, currently plays for the Atlanta Hawks. 
Len Chappell, former NBA player.(Jersey Retired). 
Brandon Childress (2020), professional basketball player
Randolph Childress, former professional basketball player who last played in Italy for Cestistica San Severo, current assistant coach for the Wake Forest Demon Deacons.
Charlie Davis, former NBA player for the Cleveland Cavaliers and Portland Trail Blazers, Fourth-team All-American, 1971 ACC Player of the Year.(Jersey Retired).
Tim Duncan (B.A. 1997), retired NBA player, #1 overall pick in 1997 NBA Draft, 15-time NBA All-Star, two-time NBA MVP, five-time NBA Champion, member of Naismith Memorial Basketball Hall of Fame (Jersey Retired).
Justin Gray, professional basketball player for BC Tsmoski-Minsk.
Murray Greason, former college basketball and baseball coach, 1956 ACC Coach of the Year.
Kenny Green, #12 pick of the 1985 NBA Draft, former NBA player for Washington Bullets and Philadelphia 76ers.
Rod Griffin, 17th pick of the 1977 NBA Draft, former professional basketball player
 C. J. Harris, basketball player in the Israeli Basketball Premier League
Dickie Hemric, former NBA player, 1957 NBA champion with the Boston Celtics (Jersey retired)
Jaylen Hoard (born 1999), French-American basketball player for Hapoel Tel Aviv of the Israeli Basketball Premier League
Josh Howard, Former NBA player, forward-guard for the Washington Wizards NBA team.(Jersey Retired).
Dearica Hamby, #6 pick in the 2015 WNBA Draft, currently plays for Las Vegas Aces. 
Jennifer Hoover (B.A. 1991), current head coach of the Wake Forest demon deacons women's basketball team.
Frank Johnson, #11 pick in the 1981 NBA Draft
Jim Johnstone, former professional basketball player
James Johnson, small forward for the Dallas Mavericks NBA team 
Chris King, retired professional basketball player
Rusty LaRue, former NBA player
Paul Long, former NBA and ABA basketball player 
Chas McFarland, former professional basketball player
Gil McGregor, former NBA player, CBA champion.
Kevin McMillan, current head coach of the University of Tennessee at Martin women's basketball team
Doral Moore, NBA player
Codi Miller-McIntyre (2016), professional basketball player for Parma Basket.
Dinos Mitoglou, Greek professional basketball player for Panathinaikos
Guy Morgan, former NBA player.
Jack Murdock, former basketball player and coach.
Billy Packer, CBS Sports college basketball analyst.
Chris Paul (2007), #3 overall pick in 2005 NBA Draft, guard for the Phoenix Suns, 2005–2006 NBA Rookie of the Year, 10-time NBA All-Star. (Jersey Retired) 
Eddie Payne, former college basketball head coach at University of South Carolina Upstate.
Ricardo Peral Antunez, former Spanish professional basketball player
Rodney Rogers, 9th overall pick of the 1993 NBA Draft, former NBA player. (Jersey Retired).
Delaney Rudd, former professional basketball player 
Alexandra Sharp (2020), professional basketball player
Ish Smith, NBA player for the Washington Wizards.
Darius Songaila, player for Washington Wizards, previously Sacramento Kings and Chicago Bulls. 
Anthony Teachey, former professional basketball player.
Jeff Teague, point guard for the Milwaukee Bucks NBA team
Pat Williams, senior vice president of the Orlando Magic.
Danny Young, former NBA player for the Portland Trail Blazers.
Kyle Visser, basketball player who last played for Phantoms Braunschweig of the German Bundesliga. 
Devin Thomas, currently plays for TED Ankara Kolejliler.  
Ron Watts, Former NBA player with Boston Celtics, 1966 NBA Champion. 
Coron Williams, professional basketball player 
Keyshawn Woods, professional basketball player
L.D. Williams, NBA Development League player, last played for the Fort Wayne Mad Ants, current free agent 
Loren Woods (Transferred to Arizona), professional basketball player
Ty Walker, professional basketball player.

Golf

Billy Andrade, PGA Tour
Larry Beck, PGA Tour 
Darren Clarke, European Tour, PGA Tour
Laura Diaz, LPGA Tour
Brendan Gielow, professional golfer
Bill Haas, PGA Tour
Jay Haas, PGA Tour, Champions Tour 
Jerry Haas, PGA Tour, Nationwide Tour, European Tour
Gary Hallberg, PGA Tour, Nationwide Tour, European Tour
Scott Hoch, Ryder Cup 
Joe Inman, PGA Tour, Champions Tour 
Patty Jordan, LPGA Tour
Jennifer Kupcho, LPGA Tour
Len Mattiace, PGA Tour
Marta Prieto, Ladies European Tour
Arnold Palmer, PGA Tour, Champions Tour, winner of seven major championships
Webb Simpson, PGA Tour, winner of 2012 U.S. Open
Curtis Strange, PGA Tour, Champions Tour, winner of the 1988 and 1989 U.S. Opens
Kyle Reifers, PGA Tour
Lanny Wadkins, PGA Tour, Champions Tour, winner of 1977 PGA Championship
Cheyenne Woods, Ladies European Tour, LPGA Tour, niece of Tiger Woods.
Helen Wadsworth, Ladies European Tour

Olympians
Andy Bloom, Olympic shot putter 
Houry Gebeshian (2014), competed at the 2016 Summer Olympics
Hunter Kemper, triathlon, 2000 Summer Olympics, 2004 Summer Olympics, 2008 Summer Olympics, 2012 Summer Olympics
Michelle Kasold, field hockey, London 2012
Brent LaRue, Olympic athlete (hurdler)

Soccer

Lyle Adams, retired professional soccer player
Anthony Arena, professional soccer player 
Luis Argudo, MLS soccer player who currently plays for Columbus Crew SC.
Cody Arnoux, professional soccer player.
Bianca D'Agostino, retired professional soccer player.
Jon Bakero, Spanish soccer player who currently plays for Chicago Fire of Major league Soccer.
Corben Bone, professional soccer player for FC Cincinnati.
Evan Brown, retired professional soccer player
Brian Carroll, Major League Soccer, Philadelphia Union
Ryan Caugherty, Korean retired professional soccer player
Nick Courtney, professional soccer player for New York Athletic Club.
Neil Covone, retired professional soccer player
Sam Cronin, professional soccer player who currently plays for Minnesota United of Major league Soccer.
Steven Curfman, American soccer player who currently plays for CASL Elite 
Austin da Luz, professional soccer player for North Carolina FC.
Raimo de Vries, former professional soccer player
Luciano Delbono, professional soccer player for Carolina Railhawks.
Ihor Dotsenko, retired Dutch-American soccer player
Chris Duvall, professional soccer player for Portland Timbers of Major league Soccer
Brian Edwards, retired professional soccer player
Chris Estridge, former professional soccer player 
Steven Echevarria, professional soccer player for New York Red Bulls II 
Bayley Feist (2018), professional soccer player
Kaley Fountain, professional soccer player
Sam Fink, professional soccer player who currently plays for Saint Louis FC of USL.
Akira Fitzgerald, Current professional soccer player for Tampa Bay Rowdies.
Michael Gamble, current professional soccer player for Tulsa Roughnecks in USL. 
Ally Haran (2017), professional soccer player
Madison Hammond (2019), professional soccer player
Jack Harrison, #1 overall pick in the 2016 MLS SuperDraft, currently plays for Middlesbrough F.C. on loan from Manchester City F.C.
Ian Harkes, professional soccer player for D.C. United. 
Jacori Hayes, professional soccer player for FC Dallas.
 William Hesmer, retired professional soccer player. 
John Hackworth, former professional soccer player, current head coach of the United States men's National Under-17 Soccer team. 
Tolani Ibikunle, professional soccer player.
Kelvin Jones, professional soccer player. 
Shaun Kalnasy, former professional soccer player
Stephen Keel, professional soccer player.
Aubrey Kingsbury, professional soccer player for Washington Spirit. 
Michael Lahoud, professional soccer player for FC Cincinnati.
Michael Lisch, professional soccer player.
Amir Lowery, professional soccer player.
Andrew Lubahn, professional soccer player for Pittsburgh Riverhounds SC. 
Zen Luzniak, former professional soccer player
Collin Martin, professional soccer player for Minnesota United.
Nick Millington, retired professional soccer player
Kristen Meier, professional soccer player.
Justin Moose, Major League Soccer, D.C. United 
Marisa Park, professional soccer player.
Ben Newnam, professional soccer player.
Sean Okoli, professional soccer player for Landskrona BoIS. 
Matthew Olson, retired professional soccer player
Ike Opara, professional soccer player for Sporting Kansas City
Michael Parkhurst, 2005 Major League Soccer Rookie of the Year, New England Revolution  
Peyton Perea (2018), professional soccer player
Hayden Partain, professional soccer player for Sacramento Republic. 
Pat Phelan, Major League Soccer player for Toronto FC 
Kevin Politz, professional soccer player for New York Red Bulls.
Sam Raben (born 1997), professional soccer player
James Riley, Major League Soccer player for the New England Revolution 
Jalen Robinson, professional soccer player for D.C. United.
Andy Rosenband, professional soccer player for Chicago Storm. 
Zack Schilawski, professional soccer player
Ryan Solle, professional soccer player
Katie Stengel (2013), professional soccer player for Utah Royals FC.
Scott Sealy, Major League Soccer player for the Kansas City Wizards
Wells Thompson, MLS player, Colorado Rapids.

Tennis

Bea Bielik, former professional tennis player 
Romain Bogaerts (Belgian) tennis player
Borna Gojo (Croatian) tennis player
Jeff Landau, 1994 U.S. amateur champion 
Cory Parr, former professional tennis player
Noah Rubin, Wimbledon junior singles champion
Christian Seraphim (German) professional tennis player

References

External links
Wake Forest University

Wake Forest people